Saros cycle series 144 for solar eclipses occurs at the Moon's descending node, repeating every 18 years, 11 days, containing 70 events. All eclipses in this series occurs at the Moon's descending node.

Saros 144 

It is a part of Saros cycle 144, repeating every 18 years, 11 days, containing 70 events. The series started with partial solar eclipse on April 11, 1736. It contains annular eclipses from July 7, 1880 through August 27, 2565. There are no total eclipses in the series. The series ends at member 70 as a partial eclipse on May 5, 2980. The longest duration of annularity will be 9 minutes, 52 seconds on December 29, 2168.

<noinclude>

Umbral eclipses
Umbral eclipses (annular, total and hybrid) can be further classified as either: 1) Central (two limits), 2) Central (one limit) or 3) Non-Central (one limit). The statistical distribution of these classes in Saros series 144 appears in the following table.

Events

References 
 http://eclipse.gsfc.nasa.gov/SEsaros/SEsaros144.html

External links
Saros cycle 144 - Information and visualization

Solar saros series